The 2022 Ottawa Redblacks season was the eighth season for the team in the Canadian Football League. The Redblacks were eliminated from playoff contention following their week 20 loss to the Hamilton Tiger-Cats on October 21, 2022.

The 2022 CFL season was the second season for Paul LaPolice as the team's head coach, but he was fired after leading the team to another 3–11 record. The team had also won just one home game out of 14 tries with LaPolice as head coach, including an 0–7 record in 2022. Bob Dyce, the team's special teams coordinator, was named the interim head coach on October 1, 2022.

This was Shawn Burke's first season as general manager, following the dismissal of Marcel Desjardins who had been in the role since 2013, the year prior to the Redblacks' inaugural season.

Offseason

CFL Global Draft
The 2022 CFL Global Draft took place on May 3, 2022. With the format being a snake draft, the Redblacks selected eighth in the odd-numbered rounds and second in the even-numbered rounds.

CFL National Draft
The 2022 CFL Draft took place on May 3, 2022. The Redblacks had nine selections in the eight-round draft, including a territorial selection in second round. The team had the second selection in each round of the draft after finishing second-last in the 2021 league standings.

Preseason

Schedule

 Games played with white uniforms.

Regular season

Standings

Schedule

 Games played with white uniforms.
 Games played with colour uniforms.
 Games played with alternate uniforms.

Team

Roster

Coaching staff

References

External links
 

2022 Canadian Football League season by team
2022 in Ontario
Ottawa Redblacks seasons